Giovanni Cristofari (born 24 June 1993) is an Italian footballer who currently is on a free agent.

Biography
Cristofari was a youth product of A.S. Roma. However, he left the club before entering their reserve team. In January 2010 Cristofari was signed by Palermo. In 2012, he was signed by Prato on a free transfer. in 2013 the club was signed by Nocerina. However, after the club was expelled from the league, he was transferred to Benevento.

In July 2014 he was signed by Como on a free transfer. In July 2015 Cristofari was signed by Martina Franca.

Cristofari became a free agent circa 2016. On 11 March 2017 Cristofari was signed by Ancona.

References

External links
 AIC profile (data by football.it) 
 

Italian footballers
A.S. Roma players
Palermo F.C. players
A.C. Prato players
A.S.G. Nocerina players
Benevento Calcio players
Como 1907 players
A.S. Martina Franca 1947 players
Serie C players
Italy youth international footballers
Association football midfielders
Footballers from Rome
1993 births
Living people